Randolph was a 664-ton ship-rigged merchant vessel constructed in 1849 in Sunderland. She was one of the First Four Ships that brought settlers to Christchurch, New Zealand (the other three were Cressy,  and Charlotte Jane).

The Canterbury Association chartered Randolph, with Captain William Dale serving as the ship's captain. Randolph  left Gravesend on 4 September 1850, and Plymouth on the night of 7 September 1850. She arrived at Lyttelton 99 days later on 16 December 1850, with 34 cabin passengers, 15 intermediate and 161 steerage passengers.

She departed Port Victoria (Lyttelton) on 10 January 1851, bound for the "Straights of Lombock".

She was lost on 25 June 1851, on a reef off Amber Island, Mauritius. She had on board a cargo of sugar for London, a large amount of money, and 254 Indian emigrants for Port Louis. Nothing belonging to the vessel could be saved. Mr. Scott, an officer of the Madras Army, swam on shore, but died a moment after reaching it from exhaustion. Two European sailors, nine men (immigrants), ten women and three children were drowned.

Randolphs entry in Lloyd's Register for 1851 carries the annotation "Wrecked".

The ship is remembered in the name of a road, Randolph Terrace, in the port of Lyttelton.

References

Shipwrecks in the Indian Ocean
Victorian-era merchant ships of the United Kingdom
Maritime incidents in June 1851
Canterbury Association
History of Christchurch
1849 ships
Ships built on the River Wear
1850s in Christchurch
Migrant ships to New Zealand